The 1880 United States presidential election in Texas was held on November 2, 1880, as part of the 1880 United States presidential election. State voters chose eight electors to represent the state in the Electoral College, which chose the president and vice president.

Texas voted for the Democratic nominee Winfield S. Hancock, who received 64% of the vote. Texas was Hancock's fourth-strongest state. It was also the strongest state for Greenback candidate James B. Weaver, who received 11.34% of the vote.

Results

See also
 United States presidential elections in Texas

References

1880
Texas
1880 Texas elections